For the 1930s North Melbourne player, see Stewart Anderson (footballer).

Stuart Anderson (born 27 June 1974) is an Australian rules footballer. He comes from the Victorian town of Sale. In 1994 he was drafted by North Melbourne where he played 61 games as a midfielder/half-forward, including the 1996 premiership. At the end of the 1997 he was traded to the Fremantle Dockers in return for Winston Abraham. His career declined after the move west, only managing to play 9 games in 1998 for the Dockers. After failing to be selected in the league team at the beginning of the 1999 season, Anderson left the Fremantle Football Club mid year.
   
He was educated at Wesley College, Melbourne.

Anderson played 21 first eleven games for the Melbourne Cricket Club between 1992/93 and 2000/01.

He is the cousin of Australian comedian Wil Anderson.

Statistics

|-
|- style="background-color: #EAEAEA"
! scope="row" style="text-align:center" | 1994
|style="text-align:center;"|
| 5 || 3 || 2 || 1 || 13 || 8 || 21 || 0 || 0 || 0.7 || 0.3 || 4.3 || 2.7 || 7.0 || 0.0 || 0.0 || 0
|-
! scope="row" style="text-align:center" | 1995
|style="text-align:center;"|
| 5 || 16 || 0 || 1 || 154 || 98 || 252 || 45 || 13 || 0.0 || 0.1 || 9.6 || 6.1 || 15.8 || 2.8 || 0.8 || 1
|- style="background-color: #EAEAEA"
|style="text-align:center;background:#afe6ba;"|1996†
|style="text-align:center;"|
| 5 || 22 || 11 || 12 || 177 || 121 || 298 || 45 || 21 || 0.5 || 0.5 || 8.0 || 5.5 || 13.5 || 2.0 || 1.0 || 1
|-
! scope="row" style="text-align:center" | 1997
|style="text-align:center;"|
| 5 || 20 || 7 || 6 || 120 || 81 || 201 || 34 || 15 || 0.4 || 0.3 || 6.0 || 4.1 || 10.1 || 1.7 || 0.8 || 0
|- style="background-color: #EAEAEA"
! scope="row" style="text-align:center" | 1998
|style="text-align:center;"|
| 6 || 9 || 3 || 2 || 62 || 41 || 103 || 30 || 6 || 0.3 || 0.2 || 6.9 || 4.6 || 11.4 || 3.3 || 0.7 || 0
|- class="sortbottom"
! colspan=3| Career
! 70
! 23
! 22
! 526
! 349
! 875
! 154
! 55
! 0.3
! 0.3
! 7.5
! 5.0
! 12.5
! 2.2
! 0.8
! 2
|}

References

External links

1974 births
Living people
Fremantle Football Club players
North Melbourne Football Club players
North Melbourne Football Club Premiership players
Sale Football Club players
People educated at Wesley College (Victoria)
Australian rules footballers from Victoria (Australia)
People from Sale, Victoria
Peel Thunder Football Club players
South Fremantle Football Club players
One-time VFL/AFL Premiership players